Afrochilis insularis is the only known member of the genus Afrochilis of the family Machilidae, which is from the order Archaeognatha. It is endemic to the Socotra archipelago, a group of isolated islands.

References

Archaeognatha
Endemic fauna of Socotra
Insects described in 2001